AirTrain is a fully automated people mover at San Francisco International Airport (SFO) that opened on February 24, 2003. The service charges no fares, but funded by a fee charged to rental car customers. The system is located outside of the sterile area of each terminal, meaning passengers must exit and re-enter through a security checkpoint when using AirTrain to travel between terminals.

Lines and stations 

AirTrain operates on two lines—Red Line and Blue Line—both of which run every  minutes. The Red Line travels in a clockwise loop, beginning with Garage G station and ending with Garage A station, which takes about 9 minutes to complete. The Blue Line travels in a counterclockwise loop, serving the same stations in reverse order, and also proceeding to West Field Road, the Rental Car Center, and long-term parking, which takes 25 minutes for a round trip.

A $15 million infill station was constructed to serve the Grand Hyatt at SFO, a new airport hotel. The hotel opened on October 7, 2019.

From 2003 to 2021, AirTrain did not provide access to SFO's long-term parking garage and lots; instead, passengers had to take a free airport shuttle bus between the airport terminals and the long-term parking areas. The extension is estimated to eliminate  previously driven by the shuttle buses each year.

The AirTrain stations at the International Terminal are located one level above ticketing, at both ends of the main hall. Stations at Terminals 1, 2, and 3 are located on level 5 of the domestic parking garage and can be accessed from mezzanine-level skybridges located near security checkpoints B, D, and F. The Garage A and G stations are accessible from level 7 of each garage. The long-term parking station is connected by a skybridge to level 5 of the long-term parking garage.

Technical details 

The AirTrain system was built by Bombardier Transportation at a cost of US $430 million and is composed of 38 Innovia APM 100 cars coupled in trains of up to three cars. The APM 100 cars can also be found at airports in Tampa, Denver, Atlanta, Seattle-Tacoma, Houston, and Madrid. They are operated automatically under Bombardier's Cityflo 650 Communications-based train control signaling technology, making it one of the first radio-based train control systems to enter service.

The entire AirTrain fleet is accessible and allows rented baggage carts on board.

The Airport Development Plan from 2016 forecasted that ridership on the two lines would be over capacity in the future (42% and 87% over capacity on the Red and Blue Lines respectively) and recommended upgrades that would increase capacity. Specific upgrades included acquiring 30 additional AirTrain cars, upgrading existing stations to accommodate 4-car trains, and upgrading the maintenance facility to accommodate additional vehicles.

See also 
 Airport rail link
 Coliseum–Oakland International Airport line

References

External links 

 

Airport people mover systems in the United States
San Francisco International Airport
San Francisco
Innovia people movers
Public transportation in San Francisco
Railway lines opened in 2003
Rapid transit in California
2003 establishments in California